Wendell Lucena Ramalho (21 or 22 November 1947 – 23 May 2022), known mononymously as Wendell, was a Brazilian football goalkeeper and coach. He played seven matches for the Brazil national team from 1973 to 1974, and was a substitute goalkeeper at the 1974 FIFA World Cup.

References

1947 births
2022 deaths
Sportspeople from Recife
Brazilian footballers
Association football goalkeepers
Brazil international footballers
Santa Cruz Futebol Clube players
Fluminense FC players
Guarani FC players
Vila Nova Futebol Clube players
Botafogo de Futebol e Regatas players